The Gulf Times newspaper has been founded in 1978 as the first publication of the Gulf Publishing and Printing Company in the capital city of Qatar, Doha (or ad-Dawhah). It is one of three English language newspapers in the country (the others being The Peninsula [1995] and the Qatar Tribune [2006]). It is published by Abdullah bin Hamad Al Attiyah, the former deputy prime minister and the former head of the Emir's court. The current chairman of Gulf Times is Abdullah bin Khalifa al-Attiya, while the editor-in-chief is Faisal Abdulhameed al-Mudahka making the editor in charge K T Chacko.

History 
The Gulf Times, Qatar, (the first publication of the Gulf Publishing and Printing Organisation) was founded on 1 June 1978. Its contract was signed and the required license was issued on 5 August 1978, in accordance with the laws of Qatar. The first edition of Gulf Times was published on 10 December 1978, as a black-and-white tabloid, under the leadership of Yousef Jassim Darwish, the editor-in-chief of both Gulf Times and later the sister Arabic-language paper Al Raya. The acting Ministry of Information at that time declared and confirmed the formation and the creation of a Qatari based English newspaper that is now known till this day as ‘Gulf Times’. They have published their first ever publication during the month of December in the year of 1978 as a weekly paper. Three years later in February 1981, the newspaper was approved to be published every day.

On 1 January 1993, Gulf Publishing & Printing Company—encompassing both the Gulf Times and Al Raya—moved to new headquarters in the Al Hilal Area, on the C Ring Road, with a larger printing press, more up-to-date facilities and more office space. The newspaper could now grow both in physical size and publishing figures.

In December 1995, Gulf Times was converted from tabloid to broadsheet and the content was increased considerably and further enhanced. With that being said, the newspaper not only focuses on local news but so too on international news too. Currently, a Gulf Times newspaper is 40 pages, broadsheet, with a separate monthly magazine, called Society. There are eight different categories that consist of Gulf Times. Indeed, such as, editorial, analysis, news, economy, sports, library and archives, technical and local reporters.

Recently, Gulf Times expanded coverage by adding more pages dedicated to Latin America and Africa and also in business and finance and sports.

The paper is one of the leading publications in the English language market in Qatar. It has been notable for carrying news reports that go beyond the self-censorship usual to the Persian Gulf region. It pioneered reporting of criminal court cases, including reporting serious offences by Qatari nationals and other negative social issues, such as the black market in alcohol, but has since become more conservative. It was the first Gulf paper to document the mistreatment of very young camel jockeys in a report that is credited with leading to the reform of the camel racing industry in several Gulf states.

Society is the premier monthly lifestyle magazine published by Gulf Times newspaper in Doha, Qatar. Launched in January 2012, the magazine offers a broad range of features, primarily based on lifestyle, hospitality and social issues, relevant to Qatar expatriates and nationals. Its contents and voices are guided by the needs and aspirations of the people of Qatar and their opinions, choices and needs, ultimately making the magazine a very strong platform for people to reach out and make a difference.

The magazine is being distributed free of cost to the subscribers of the Gulf Times newspaper.

Logo 

Upon conception, the Gulf Times' emblem remained a dhow named Fateh al-Kheir. Its significance lays in both its representation of Qatar's history and its ownership by former Ruler Sheikh Hamad Bin Khalifa. Not only did it possess the country's first engine, it was the first nationally owned dhow and largest of its kind. The color of the logo is maroon and white, the color of the Qatari Flag. Consequently, this color was chosen to further represent the national identity of the newspaper, Qatar.  The color obtains further value as maroon symbolizes the historical background and identity of what made Qatar, as the bloodshed of the many people that died for the independence of Qatar. Indeed, the white reflected the peace and harmony in the country.

In line with the nation's pearl diving industry, it was crafted in the 1920s using wood from the North of Oman and was in service up until the 1940s. At the death of the pearl diving industry the dhow is widely perceived to have been disposed. However, the dhow has been retrieved and can be found in the National Museum amongst other traditional fleets.

References

External links

1978 establishments in Qatar
English-language newspapers published in Qatar
Mass media in Doha
Newspapers established in 1978